Under the Influence is the second album by Irish singer Mary Coughlan. It was first released in 1987 by Warner Music (at the time called WEA).

Reception
The album received a 4 and a half star rating on Allmusic. The single "Ride On" reached number 5 on the Irish Pop Charts in 1987.

Track listing
 "Laziest Girl" (Cole Porter)
 "Ice Cream Man" (Johnny Mulhern)
 "Ice Cream Van" (D. Murphey)
 "Parade of Clowns" (R. Crispijn, H. Van Veen, E. Van Der Wurff)
 "My Land Is Too Green" (Antoinette Hensey, Erik Visser)
 "Ride On" (Jimmy MacCarthy)
 "Good Morning Heartache" (Ervin Drake, Dan Fisher, Irene Higginbotham)
 "Fifteen Only" (Wedekind Dress)
 "AWOL" (H. Visser, L. Geuens, Antoinette Hensey)
 "The Dice" (Antoinette Hensey, Erik Visser)
 "Don't Smoke in Bed" (Willard Robison)
 "Blue Surrender" (D. Long)
 "Sunday Mornings" (Molly McAnally Burke)
 "Coda" (Antoinette Hensey, Erik Visser)

Personnel
Mary Coughlan - vocals
Connor Barry - acoustic guitar, electric guitar
Jerome Rimson - bass
Robbie Brennan - drums
Noel Eccles - percussion
Raoul Eurlings - piano on "My Land Is Too Green"
Trevor Knight - piano, synthesizer
Davy Spillane - Uilleann pipes
Theo van Tol - accordion
Richie Buckley - tenor and soprano saxophone
Helen Walsh, Rita Connolly, Valerie Armstrong - backing vocals
Arthur De Groodt - cello
Pleun Van Der Linden, Sylvia Houtzager - violin
Coen Van Der Heide - viola
André Vulperhorst - tuba
Peter Williams, Erik Visser - Fairlight programming

References

1987 albums
Mary Coughlan (singer) albums
Warner Records albums